Mujdei (plural: mujdeie) is a spicy Romanian sauce. It is made from garlic cloves crushed and ground into a paste, salted and mixed energetically with vegetable oil (almost always sunflower oil). Depending on regional preferences and the dish it is served with, lemon or other ingredients may be added. The result is a white sauce with a strong garlic flavor, varying in consistency from a thick paste to a runny sauce. In some parts of Romania mujdei is made out of cream, ground garlic, and salt. Sometimes ground garlic, salt, little water, oil and paprika powder.

It is served with a variety of dishes, including fried fish, fried or grilled chicken or pork, rasol, and fried potatoes.

The word is derived from "must de ai", akin to the French «mousse d'ail» that is, 'must or mousse of garlic'.

See also
 Agliata – an Italian garlic sauce
 Skordalia - a similar Greek garlic dip
 Aioli
 Garlic sauce
 List of dips
 List of garlic dishes
 List of sauces

Notes and references 

Romanian sauces
Garlic dishes
Romanian words and phrases